Steel Division 2 is a real-time strategy video game developed and published by Eugen Systems. The game was released worldwide on 20 June 2019. Steel Division 2 is the sequel to the 2017 game Steel Division: Normandy 44 and it was set during Operation Bagration.

Gameplay
Set during Operation Bagration, Steel Division 2 is a real-time strategy video game that takes influence from World War II, similarly to its predecessor, Steel Division: Normandy 44. The game is set to include single-player, multiplayer, and cooperative aspects. The single-player is dubbed "Dynamic Strategic Campaigns" and is turn-based (unlike the previous game), with each turn being the equivalent of half a day, though combat is done in real-time. The multiplayer allows for up to twenty players in ten against ten battles. Both modes feature twenty-five maps that are scaled 1:1 with a size of up to 150 × 100 kilometres, and cover the details of the battles that took place during the aforementioned operation. Able to play as both the Allied powers and Axis powers, players have the option of eighteen divisions and more with DLC, with the capability to choose from over six hundred units when building a deck. Decks are used during game, and only units in the deck can be deployed. Cooperative missions are also planned. Players who owned the first Steel Division game can have access to some 8 divisions (Both Axis and Allies) with over 350 units. The game supports mods.

Development
In early 2018, a strike of almost half of the developers at Eugen Systems took place, ceasing work until April, with no news on the subject being released until the announcement for Steel Division 2. The pronouncement was published July 25, 2018, alongside a trailer. It was declared that Paradox Interactive would not be publishing the game, despite their involvement with Steel Division: Normandy 44. Consequently, the game will be the first by Eugen Systems to be independently published. Alexis Le Dressay, the game director and company co-founder, said they listened to fan feedback from Steel Division: Normandy 44, and made relevant improvements. An updated game engine (the IrisZoom engine), redeveloped combat mechanics, and a new art style were noted as examples.

A final release date of June 20, 2019 was announced following two prior delays.

Reception
The game received "mixed or average" reviews according to review aggregator Metacritic.
On the video game distribution website Steam it stands at "Mostly Positive".

References

External links 
 

2019 video games
Real-time strategy video games
Strategy video games
MacOS games
Multiplayer and single-player video games
Video game sequels
Video games developed in France
Video games set in Finland
Video games set in Poland
Video games set in Russia
Video games set in the 1940s
Video games set in Ukraine
Windows games
World War II video games